Cossipur Assembly constituency was a Legislative Assembly constituency of Kolkata district in the Indian state of West Bengal.

Overview
As a consequence of the orders of the Delimitation Commission, Cossipur Assembly constituency ceases to exist from 2011.
 
It was part of Calcutta North West (Lok Sabha constituency).

Members of Legislative Assembly

Results

1977-2009
In the 2006 and 2001 state assembly elections Tarak Bandopadhyay representing Trinamool Congress won the 140 Cossipur assembly seat defeating Salil Chatterjee of CPI (M), and Bijoy Bhattacharjee of CPI(M) respectively. In 1996, Tarak Bandopadhyay representing Congress defeated Anup Das of CPI(M). Dipak Chanda of CPI(M) defeated Prafulla Kanti Ghosh of Congress in 1991 and 1987. In 1982, Prafulla Kanti Ghosh of Congress defeated Buddhadeb Bhattacharya of CPI(M). In 1977, Buddhadeb Bhattacharya of CPI(M) defeated Prafulla Kanti Ghosh of Congress.

1951-1972
The Cossipore seat was won by Prafulla Kanti Ghosh of Congress defeating his nearest rival Paresh Nath Banerjee of CPI(M) in 1972 and Krishna Gopal Basu of CPI(M) in 1971. Vishnu Gopal Basu of CPI(M) defeated Sushil Kumar Paul of Congress in 1969. S.K.Roy of Congress defeated P.Dasguta of CPI(M) in 1967. Sunil Kumar Dasgupta of Congress won in 1962 defeating Mohit Kumar Moitra of CPI(M). Deben Sen of PSP won in 1957 defeating Biswanath Roy of Congress. Biswanath Roy of Congress won in independent India’s first general election in 1951 defeating Jyotirmoy Sharma of CPI.

References

Former assembly constituencies of West Bengal
Politics of Kolkata district